Bulgaria competed at the 1988 Summer Paralympics in Seoul, South Korea. 8 competitors from Bulgaria won 3 medals, 2 gold and 1 silver and finished 32nd in the medal table.

See also 
 Bulgaria at the Paralympics
 Bulgaria at the 1988 Summer Olympics

References 

Bulgaria at the Paralympics
1988 in Bulgarian sport
Nations at the 1988 Summer Paralympics